Dumbadze is a Georgian surname, which may refer to:

 Gela Dumbadze (born 1965), a Georgian diplomat and government official 
 Ivan Dumbadze (1851–1916), an Imperial Russian general
 Nina Dumbadze (1919–1983), a Soviet-Georgian discus thrower
 Nodar Dumbadze (1928–1984), a Georgian writer 
 Roman Dumbadze (1964–2012), a Georgian general  

Surnames of Georgian origin
Georgian-language surnames